Ọlawale Ọlọfọrọ (born Olawale Ibrahim Ashimi; 9 May 1986), better known as Brymo, is a Nigerian singer, songwriter, actor and author. Born and raised in Okokomaiko, he started recording music in 1999 while in secondary school. He signed a record deal with Chocolate City in 2010 but was accused of breaching his contract with the label in 2013. Brymo released his debut studio album Brymstone in 2007. His second studio album The Son of a Kapenta was released in 2012; it was supported by the singles "Ara", "Good Morning" and "Go Hard". His third studio album Merchants, Dealers & Slaves was released on 20 October 2013; it received positive reviews from music critics and was preceded by two singles; "Down" and "Eko". 

In October 2014, Brymo released his fourth studio album Tabula Rasa; its lead single "Fe Mi" was described as a "soft traditional ballad". His eight-track compilation album, titled Trance, was released on 8 December 2015. It was primarily targeted at audiences in the U.S., and contains songs from the albums Merchants, Dealers & Slaves and Tabula Rasa. Brymo released his fifth studio album Klĭtôrĭs on 9 May 2016; it was nominated for Best R&B/Pop Album at The Headies 2016 and for Album of the Year at The Headies 2018. In March 2018, Brymo released his critically acclaimed sixth studio album Oṣó. A mixture of alternative folk and Yoruba music, the album was supported by the singles "Heya!" and "Bá’núsọ". Brymo teamed up with three members of Skata Vibration to form A.A.A, an alternative rock band whose eponymous debut EP was released in August 2019. 

His seventh studio album Yellow was released on 1 April 2020; it was nominated for Best Alternative Album and Album of the Year at The Headies 2020. Brymo released his debut extended play, titled Libel, on 5 November 2020. Comprising five tracks, the EP was produced entirely by Bigfoot and features guest vocals by Deborah Prest. In September 2021, Brymo simultaneously released 9: Èsan and 9: Harmattan & Winter, as his eighth and ninth studio albums, respectively. His tenth studio album Theta was released on 27 May 2022; it comprises 10 tracks and was recorded entirely in Nigerian Pidgin. In August 2022, he released a collaborative album with rapper A-Q, titled Ethos. Brymo has released three books: Oriri's Plight (2018), Verses (2020) and The Bad Tooth (2022), and starred in the films Price of Admission (2021) and Elesin Oba, The King's Horseman (2022).

Life and career

Early life and career beginnings
Olawale Ashimi was born and raised in Okokomaiko, Ojo, Lagos State; his father is an Awori carpenter and his mother is an Egun petty trader; he is the only child of his parents. Brymo grew up in a multi-faith household and learned to recite the entire Qur'an after being enrolled into an Islamic School. He went to Aganju Aka Primary School and later enrolled at Japual Primary School.

He was initially interested in playing football after graduating from secondary school. In 1999, he recorded his first song while in secondary school and titled it "Future". In 2002, Brymo and some of his friends formed a group called The Aliens. They were active between 2004 and 2005, but disbanded in 2005. Brymo was inspired to create music after listening to his mother singing fuji songs. Brymo gained admission to Lagos State University (LASU), where he studied zoology, but after his second year he left LASU to pursue a career in music.

2007–2012: Brymstone, "Oleku" collaboration, and The Son of a Kapenta 
Brymo released his debut studio album Brymstone in 2007. Its lead single "Shawty" was accompanied by a music video. He told Damiete Braide of The Sun he chose R&B after being influenced by the work of R. Kelly and the Backstreet Boys. He also told Braide he sold more than 2,000 copies of the album within six months of its release. In a 2013 interview with The Sun, Brymo said management problems prevented him from getting a marketing deal for the album and that he had a one-million naira offer that did not work out because of technical issues. Brymo also said Brymstone is his worst body of work but credits it with helping him get a foot in the music business.

Brymo was featured on the hit single "Oleku", which was released as the lead single from Ice Prince's debut studio album Everybody Loves Ice Prince (2011). Brymo told Tony Erhariefe of The Sun that his inspiration for recording the hook of "Oleku" came from the passion and energy around him, and from hunger and desperation. He also said that although the song did not necessarily generate money, it gave him exposure. In 2010, Denrele Edun, whom he met few years earlier, asked Brymo if he knew the rapper M.I, who was interested in talking with him. In 2010, Brymo signed to the label Chocolate City after talking with M.I. Prior to his record deal with Chocolate City, he collaborated with Jesse Jagz on the song "Love You", which appeared on the rapper's debut studio album Jag of All Tradez (2011).

Brymo released his second studio album The Son of a Kapenta on 15 November 2012. It features guest appearances from Jesse Jagz, Pryse, M.I, Ice Prince and Efya. The album was recorded in English and Yoruba. On 18 September 2011, Brymo released the Legendury Beatz-produced track "Ara" as the album's lead single. Its music video was directed by Aje Filmworks and was released on 31 December 2011. Brymo told Damiete Braide of The Sun that "Ara" is a slang term that loosely translates to "wonder". In a July 2012 interview with Adeola Adeyemo of BellaNaija, Brymo said he recorded the song while being under pressure from Chocolate City to submit a single. He also revealed that "Ara" was written six months after he recorded "Good Morning".

On 16 April 2012, Brymo released "Good Morning" as the album's second single. Its music video was directed by Aje Filmworks and released on 30 July 2012. In a 2012 interview with The Punch newspaper, Brymo said his father's carpentry profession inspired the album's title and described The Son of a Kapenta as a summary of his life and said each song is a reflection of his energy. Brymo also said he recorded the album to be identified by his body of work as a lead artist rather than as a featured artist. In January 2013, The Nation newspaper included The Son of a Kapenta on its list of the "Albums that failed commercially in 2012".

2013–2015: Merchants, Dealers & Slaves, Tabula Rasa and Trance
Brymo released his third studio album Merchants, Dealers & Slaves on 20 October 2013. The album was produced entirely by Mikky Me and features guitar work from David. Hard copies of the album were released on 26 March 2014. On 18 October 2013, Brymo revealed the album's track list on Instagram. The album's lead single "Down" was officially released on 1 October 2013; its music video was uploaded to YouTube the previous day. Brymo dedicated the song to his family and country. In May 2014, Nigerian Entertainment Today reported that undergraduate students at Southern Illinois University Carbondale deconstructed the lyrics of "Down" as part of a case study project. Brymo was invited to the school to attend the case study presentation. On 21 October 2013, "Eko" was released as the album's second single. Critical reception to Merchants, Dealers & Slaves was positive. Ayomide Tayo of Nigeria Entertainment Today described the album as a "soulful masterpiece that is emotionally charged with amazing production".

On 14 October 2014, Brymo was announced as an ambassador for the Lagos Chamber of Commerce and Industry. He released his fourth studio album Tabula Rasa on 30 October 2014; his manager Lanre Lawal announced plans for the release during an interview with The Punch in October 2014. Lawal also told The Sun the album would be a fusion of African folk and popular music. Brymo told The Nation newspaper he recorded the album to move on from his controversial split with Chocolate City. He decided to name the album Tabula Rasa after hearing the judge use it in a speech. "Fe Mi" was released as the album's lead single on 18 September 2014. Ayo Onikoyi of Vanguard described the song as "a soft traditional ballad". On 6 March 2015, Brymo released a documentary about the song "1 Pound", which was directed by St. Immaculate; a teaser of the documentary was released four days prior. On 30 March 2015, he released the music video for the song "Ję Lé O Sinmi"; the video was directed by Godson KC Uma of MaadKreativity Inc and runs for 3 minutes and 59 seconds.

On 8 December 2015, Brymo released an eight-track compilation album titled Trance. It was released by American record label and publishing firm Tate Music Group and was originally scheduled for a September 2015 release. It was primarily targeted at audiences in the U.S., and contains songs from the albums Merchants, Dealers & Slaves and Tabula Rasa. Brymo described the album as a medley of thoughts based on his experiences. The album contains elements of African folk, soul, pop, and afrobeat.

Chocolate City departure
In May 2013, Brymo announced on Twitter that he had left Chocolate City. Audu Maikori, who was the CEO of Chocolate City at the time, refuted Brymo's claims during a press conference at the label's office in Lekki. Maikori said Brymo still had three years left on his contract and still needed to record two albums. Vanguard newspaper reported that during the press conference, Maikori said Brymo committed an act of insubordination when he refused to remove an inappropriate picture he posted on Instagram. While speaking to journalists in June 2013, Brymo said Chocolate City cheated him when the label failed to explain how his second studio album was leaked. He also said there was no accountability about the way his album was being sold and distributed.

In August 2013, Brymo signed a distribution deal with Spinlet, enabling the digital media company to distribute his next album online. Nigerian Entertainment Today reported that Spinlet discontinued the deal after Chocolate City made them aware of its existing contract with Brymo. On 14 October 2013, Chocolate City filed an interim injunction against Brymo, restraining him from partaking in musical ventures beyond the confines of his contract. Six days later, Brymo released his third studio album despite reports about the injunction. On 21 October, a judge at the Federal High Court of Lagos restrained Brymo from releasing and distributing any musical work pending Chocolate City's lawsuit against him.

According to The Nation newspaper, Brymo and his management met with Chocolate City representatives in October 2013 to discuss mutually-agreeable terms. Chocolate City asked Brymo to sign an agreement during the meeting, but failed. On 11 November 2013, Premium Times newspaper reported that the legal teams of both parties met in court for a hearing and that the case was adjourned to 5 December 2013. Between December 2013 and March 2014, the case was adjourned four times for several reasons. In March 2014, the Federal High Court of Lagos lifted the restraint it put on Brymo. In May 2014, Nigerian Entertainment Today reported that the judge presiding over the case pulled out after he was accused of being biased. In a radio interview with Toolz in May 2016, Brymo said he did not win the case against Chocolate City, saying, "we had the opportunity to iron it out in court but they fried it up. I don’t know what they did but they definitely spoke to the judge and spoke to the lawyers and scrapped the case, they are lawyers; they can do it."

2016–2018: Klĭtôrĭs, Oṣó and Oriri's Plight

Brymo's fifth studio album Klĭtôrĭs was released on 9 May 2016. It was made available for pre-order via iTunes prior to its release. The album comprises 11 tracks and was preceded by the lead single "Happy Memories". Brymo's girlfriend Esse Kakada is featured on the song "Naked". The original artwork for the album was designed by Georgi Georgiev of Moonring Art Design. An edited version of the artwork was done by Duks after iTunes refused to put up the original artwork. In an interview with Nigerian Entertainment Today, Brymo said the title of the album means key in the Greek language and that the album is an expression of love and the uncertainty of it. He said, "the album is the key to a certain door I have knocked on for years; and yes it was meant to be sensual, there ought to be two sides to the coin". Klĭtôrĭs was nominated for Best R&B/Pop Album at The Headies 2016 and for Album of the Year at The Headies 2018.

In November 2017, Brymo said on Twitter that plans were underway for his sixth studio album, whose title he disclosed as Oṣó (Yoruba: The Wizard) and launched a website titled theosoproject.com dedicated to the project. In August 2017, he released the Jazz-infused Afrobeat single "Do You Know Me". Oṣó was released on 27 March 2018; it consists of 11 tracks. It was produced and mixed by Brymo's frequent collaborator Mikky Me Joses. The album was mastered at Metalworks Studios in Canada. A day following the release of the album, Brymo released the music video for the lead single "Heya", which was filmed and directed by NVMB3R Production. The video features Brymo exposing his buttocks while wearing a loincloth to hide his genitals. The video received mixed reviews; in an e-mail to Pulse Nigeria, Brymo defended his decision to expose his buttocks, saying, "I decided to appear how my forebears dressed before the arrival of civilization to Nubian continent".

In September 2018, Brymo released Oriri's Plight, a self-referential fictional novel centered around a young Nubian man of the Dark Ages. The digital version of the book was published worldwide on all digital book platforms and the physical version was published in Nigeria on 4 October 2018. The book was published and distributed by Clockwyce Publishing.

2019–2021: A.A.A, Yellow, Verses, acting debut, Libel, Èsan, and Harmattan & Winter
Brymo teamed up with three members of Skata Vibration to form A.A.A, an alternative rock band composed of himself, guitarist Jad Moukarim, drummer Adey Omotade, and bassist Laughter. The band's eponymous debut EP was released on 5 August 2019. Comprising five tracks, it is a fusion of African folk and psychedelic rock. The EP was recorded at Blackstar Studios in Ikoyi, Lagos, and was mixed and mastered by Mikky Me Joses. Music critic Kolawole Michael said A.A.A is a "decent experimental piece, a litmus test that foretells what Brymo’s next project may sound like. It's a show of Brymo tenacity, a testament to his songwriting skill and vocal phrasing".

Brymo's seventh studio album Yellow was released on 1 April 2020. The album's cover art and track list were unveiled in March 2020. Brymo described Yellow as an album about "love and survival" and said it would be an alternative pop and electronic record. Yellow incorporates elements of sentimental ballad, trap, sophisti-pop, shoegaze, rock, synth-pop and folk music. The album's cover art features a rendition of Insight and Frustrations 2020, a painting by Nigerian artist Samuel Olowomeye Ancestor. Brymo revealed on Instagram that he was drawn to the painting after having several conversations with his friends. Nigerian singer Lindsey Abudei is the only artist featured on the album. With the exception of "Abụ Ya", which was co-produced by Nsikak David and Lindsey Abudei, Yellow was produced and engineered entirely by Brymo's frequent collaborator Mikky Me Joses. Thematically, the album explores topics such as love, heartbreak, socio-politics and mental health. Yellow spans three sides and was initially composed of 17 tracks: six were recorded in English, five in Nigerian Pidgin, five in Yoruba and one in Igbo. The album's three sides were numbered in Arabic, Roman and English numerals, respectively. On 24 March, Brymo cited technical reasons for omitting the tracks "Iya Awele" and "Ife" from the album. Yellow was nominated for Best Alternative Album and Album of the Year at The Headies 2020.

In April 2020, Brymo released the e-book Versus, alternatively titled Verses (Musings, Notes and Prose). Brymo made his acting debut in Udoka Oyeka's 2021 short film, Price of Admission. He played the role of Kola, a musician who struggles to get a record deal and attain fame. The film was screened in Lagos on 24 January and premeired virtually on YouTube in June 2021.

Brymo's debut extended play, titled Libel, was released on 5 November 2020. Comprising five tracks, the EP was produced entirely by Bigfoot and features guest vocals by Deborah Prest. Its cover art features a woman's panty, blood, and a broken glass. On the record, Brymo addressed the rape accusation leveled against him by a woman on social media. In a review for YNaija, Kola Muhammed characterized the EP as a "musical diary bearing tales of anguish" and said Brymo "sought to heal himself from the pain of defamation". Pulse Nigeria's Motolani Alake awarded the EP an 8.2 rating out of 10, noting that it is "largely about Brymo's journey back to life, as aided by love".

In September 2021, Brymo simultaneously released 9: Èsan and 9: Harmattan & Winter, as his eighth and ninth studio albums, respectively. A mixture of alt-rock, R&B, sentimental ballad, and folk music, both albums comprise 9 tracks and is dedicated to Brymo's romantic partner. Brymo said both albums are an ode to every woman, man, sigma, and order. He also said both records pay homage to karma and to the seasons. Recorded entirely in Yoruba, all of the songs on Èsan (Yoruba: Revenge)  were produced and mastered entirely by Mikky Me Joses. Èsan was nominated for Best Alternative Album and Album of the Year at The Headies 2022. Harmattan & Winter, recorded entirely in English, was produced by Bigfoot; its title symbolizes a transition from insufficiency to sufficiency.

2022–present: Theta, Elesin Oba, The King's Horseman, and Ethos
Brymo's tenth studio album Theta was released on May 27, 2022, along with his third book The Bad Tooth. The album comprises 10 tracks and was recorded entirely in Nigerian Pidgin. Brymo revealed the album's entire track list in a twitter post. He described the album as a "study of humanity's struggles—and a view into what it might have been". All of the tracks on the album were produced, mixed, and mastered entirely by Bigfoot. In a review for The Cable Lifestyle, Fareedat Taofeeq awarded the album 7 stars out of 10, calling it a "great piece" and commending Brymo for "maintaining his style and music direction over the years". In a review for Pulse Nigeria, Motolani Alake gave the album an 8.2 rating out of 10, acknowledging it for being simplistic and noting that it often "feels like a fly on the wall". Alake also commended Brymo for not "forcing his opinions, thoughts and views down anybody's throat". 

Brymo and rapper A-Q announced on Instagram that they would release their collaborative album, titled Ethos (stylized as ETHOS), on 12 August 2022. The album comprises 10 tracks and was produced entirely by Bigfoot. Primarily a hip-hop record, the album contains additional elements of afrobeat, jazz, folk, and R&B. A-Q described the album as "personal stories about life, loss and love". Motolani Alake of Pulse Nigeria awarded the album a 9.9 rating out of 10, praising its production and acknowledging both artists for "assuming the positions of philosophers who examined the meaning of life as it relates to self, love, and loss".

In 2022, Brymo starred in Biyi Bandele's Elesin Oba, The King's Horseman, a Yoruba-language Nigerian film based on Wole Soyinka's 1975 stage play Death and the King's Horseman. Brymo sings the background music in the film's trailer.

Artistry
Brymo's music is a mixture of fuji, R&B, pop and rock. He told Damiete Braide his music can easily be called pop due to its ability of getting across to the people. Brymo's albums Merchants, Dealers & Slaves and Tabula Rasa comment on social injustice and chaos that are prevalent in Nigerian society. In a 2016 interview with OkayAfrica, Brymo said, "Although my songs reflect many issues which are relevant in my society, I believe that human relations is the site where all issues emerge". Music critic Michael Kolawole said Brymo's music has doses of "profanity couched in intellectualism and philosophical thoughts". Kolawole also characterized his music as "affirmations of deep-rooted personal ideology, enigmatic and beautiful lyrical poetry, equations of balanced ribaldry and cheekiness".

Controversy
In January 2023, Brymo tweeted his support for Bola Tinubu in the 2023 Nigerian presidential election and suggested that an Igbo presidency will remain a pipe dream as long as there are talks about Biafra in the South East. His comments were deemed offensive and tribalistic by many of Peter Obi supporters on Twitter. Brymo previously drummed up public support for Tinubu in May 2022. A petition was signed by over 8,000 people to prevent Brymo from winning the 8th annual All Africa Music Awards.

Personal life
Brymo has a son who was born on 27 March 2015. On 12 November 2015, he uploaded pictures of his son onto his Instagram account for the first time.

Discography

Studio albums
 Brymstone (2007)
 The Son of a Kapenta (2012)
 Merchants, Dealers & Slaves (2013)
 Tabula Rasa (2014)
 Klĭtôrĭs (2016)
 Oṣó (2018)
 Yellow (2020)
9: Èsan (2021)
9: Harmattan & Winter (2021)
  Theta (2022)

Collaborative albums
Ethos (with A-Q) (2022)

Compilation and live albums 
 Trance (2015)
 Live! at Terra Kulture Arena (2019)

EPs
 A.A.A (with Skata Vibration as A.A.A) (2019)
 Libel (2020)

Filmography
Price of Admission (2021)
Elesin Oba, The King's Horseman (2022)

Books
Oriri's Plight (2018)
Verses (2020)
The Bad Tooth (2022)

References

External links

Living people
1986 births
Musicians from Lagos
Nigerian male singer-songwriters
Nigerian male pop singers
The Headies winners
Yoruba-language singers
21st-century Nigerian male singers
Lagos State University alumni